Whisper Not may refer to:

"Whisper Not" (song), written by Benny Golson in 1956
Whisper Not (Ella Fitzgerald album), 1966
Whisper Not (Keith Jarrett album), 1999